Rolando may refer to:

Entertainment
Rolando, a 2008 puzzle-adventure video game
Rolando 2: Quest for the Golden Orchid, a 2009 puzzle-adventure video game
"Rolando", a song by Roland Kirk from the album Domino

People
Rolando (given name), a Spanish, Portuguese and Italian given name
Rolando (footballer) (born 1985), Rolando Jorge Pires da Fonseca
Gloria Rolando (born 1953), Cuban filmmaker and screenwriter
Luigi Rolando (1773–1831), Italian anatomist

Places
Rolando, San Diego, US

See also
Central sulcus, originally called the "fissure of Rolando" or the "Rolandic fissure"
Roland (disambiguation)
Ronaldo (disambiguation)

it:Rolando
sl:Rolando